Serçeler can refer to:

 Serçeler, Bismil
 Serçeler, Ilgaz